Ahu Tongariki is the largest ahu on Easter Island (Rapa Nui). Its moais were toppled during the island's civil wars, and in the twentieth century the ahu was swept inland by a tsunami. It has since been restored and has fifteen moai, including one that weighs eighty-six tonnes, the heaviest ever erected on the island. Ahu Tongariki is one kilometer from Rano Raraku and Poike in the Hotu-iti area of Rapa Nui National Park.  All the moai here face sunset during the winter solstice.

History
Ahu Tongariki was the main centre and capital of the Hotu-iti clan, the eastern confederation of the Rapa Nui people. It's moai were toppled during the island's civil wars. In 1960, a tsunami caused by an earthquake off the coast of Chile swept the ahu inland.

Ahu Tongariki was substantially restored in the 1990s through the efforts of a multidisciplinary team headed by archaeologists Claudio Cristino and Patricia Vargas Casanova. The five-year project was carried out under an official agreement among the Chilean government, the University of Chile, and Japan-based crane manufacturer Tadano Limited.

Location

The ahu is on the southern coast of Rapa Nui near two extinct volcanoes, Poike and Rano Raraku.

Poike is one of the three main volcanoes that form Rapa Nui. Rano Raraku is a volcanic crater formed by consolidated volcanic ash, or tuff, from which the moai are carved. Nearly half of the hundreds of moai still lie in the main quarry on the slopes of Rano Raraku. The large, flat plain below Rano Raraku provided easy access to the tuff.

References

 Katherine Routledge (1919) The Mystery of Easter Island

External links

 Splendid Isolation: Art of Easter Island, an exhibition catalog from The Metropolitan Museum of Art (fully available online as PDF), which contains material on Ahu Tongariki
 Ahu Tongariki Restoration project
 Unofficial Easter Island Homepage
 Easter Island Statue project
 How to make Walking Moai: a hypothesis about how Moai were transported
 Czech who made Moai statues walk returns to Easter Island 
 History of Easter Island stones
 Easter Island – Moai Statue Scale
  University of Chile
  360° Panoramas dedicated web site of Easter Island

Megalithic monuments
Easter Island ahu
Tourist attractions in Valparaíso Region
Archaeological sites in Easter Island